Kevin Dodd Schon (born February 7, 1958) is an American voice actor who is known for his voice-over work in video games, movies and television shows. He is best known as a voice double for Nathan Lane for animated media, most notably as Timon in the Timon & Pumbaa television series and in various other Disney related projects.

Career
Schon began his career in 1982 in Los Angeles, while he was studying acting with Ivana Chubbuck and voice-over with Susan Blu. He first acting credit was in 1990 when he played Gillan and Gaias in the TurboGrafx CD video game, Valis II. Two years later after his debut, he played Frank II and Mirabelle in The Naked Truth and two years after that, he played Daryl O'Melveny in A Kiss Goodnight.

For many years, he was Nathan Lane's voice double, taking over the role of Timon in The Lion King's Timon and Pumbaa and singing the title song as well. He appeared in over 120 episodes of that series. He reprised the role of Timon in The Lion Guard and House of Mouse. He understudied for Lane on the animated series Teacher's Pet for ten episodes, while Lane was busy with Mel Brooks' musical of The Producers. Schon also voiced Snowbell in Stuart Little: The Animated Series and Stuart Little 3: Call of the Wild, once again replacing Nathan Lane. For three years, he was the "comedy voice" of the ABC television network, voicing all promos for their comedies (Home Improvement, Drew Carey, Roseanne, and Ellen, among others) and was the promo voice for Politically Incorrect when it moved from cable to ABC. Kevin's voice appears in over 40 episodes of Married... with Children, with two on-camera appearances.

He also voiced Lob-Star in Skylanders: Trap Team and Skylanders: SuperChargers, Otto in Ben 10: Omniverse, Activist in Infamous Second Son, Officer What in Jack and the Beanstalk, Roboy in Bubble Guppies, Onyx in Sofia the First, Dead-Eye in Jumanji, Male Patron and Male #2 in The Angry Beavers, Announcer and Weatherman in Rugrats, Velocirraptor, Peasant, Waiter and Reporter in I Am Weasel, Conductor and Hyena in Cow and Chicken, Thrakhath and Blizzard in Wing Commander Academy, Major Taibot, Abomination, Judge, Samual Laroquette and Zzzax in The Incredible Hulk, Stash in The Nuttiest Nutcracker, Muc, Luc, Wolverine 1 and Simpson in the Balto franchise, Pongo in 101 Dalmatians: The Series, Grimskull and Prince Joshua in Skeleton Warriors, Merdude and Alim Coelacanth in Teenage Mutant Ninja Turtles, Narrator in State to State, Chungu and Thurston in The Lion Guard, Elderly Peter Pan and In in Disney's Villains' Revenge, Happy in House of Mouse, VEGA and UAC Soldier in the 2016 video game Doom and provided additional voices for Battlefield: Hardline, Ben 10: Omniverse, Family Dog, Invasion America, Star Wars: Knights of the Old Republic, Doom and The Twisted Tales of Felix the Cat. In addition, he is known by cartoon "cultists" everywhere for his work on The Tick - voicing both villains and superheroes.

In late 2003, he produced More, an autobiographical one-woman show written and performed by Yeardley Smith (voice of Lisa on The Simpsons), at the Union Square Theatre in New York City. The show was critically acclaimed, but financially unsuccessful.

He was co-producer of Bat Boy: The Musical in the United Kingdom, first in a limited run in Leeds, then in a full-scale West End production at the Shaftesbury Theatre in London. Even though most press reviews were scathing, one notable exception - The Evening Standard - took up the cause for what became a groundbreaking cult classic which is now one of the most often-produced musicals in America. Film director John Landis was brought in to see the West End production and enthusiastically signed on to direct a film version. Though a film screenplay was written by the original authors under the guidance of Mr. Landis, the producers lost the rights to the property, the authors proved recalcitrant, vindictive and uncooperative, and the film remains unproduced.

Filmography

Animation
 Family Dog (1993) — Additional voices
 Teenage Mutant Ninja Turtles (1993) — Merdude, Alim Coelacanth, Wesley Knight, Landor
 All-New Dennis the Menace (1993) — Additional voices 
 Skeleton Warriors (1994) — Grimskull, Prince Joshua
 The Twisted Tales of Felix the Cat (1995) — Additional voices
 Stand by Me (1995) — Timon
 Jumanji (1996) — Dead-Eye
 Wing Commander Academy (1996) — Thrakhath, Blizzard
 The Tick (1995) — Feral Boy, Big Shot, Babyboomerangutan, Living Doll, Watt, Proto Clown
 The Incredible Hulk (1996–1997) — Samuel Laroquette, Judge, Major Glenn Talbot, Zzzax, Abomination (first voice)
 Timon and Pumbaa (1996–1998) — Timon (Season 2–3, also credited as Kevin Schoen)
 Cow and Chicken (1997) — Conductor, Hyena, Peasant, Velociraptor, Organist
 The Angry Beavers (1997) — Male Patron, Man #2
 Duckman (1997) — Additional voices
 101 Dalmatians: The Series (1997) — Pongo
 Invasion America (1998) — Additional voices
 I Am Weasel - (1998) — Velocirraptor, Peasant, Waiter, Reporter
 Rugrats - (1998) — Announcer, Weatherman
 The Nuttiest Nutcracker (1999) — Stash
 Mickey's Magical Christmas: Snowed in at the House of Mouse (2001) — Timon
 House of Mouse (2001–2002) — Timon, Happy
 Balto II: Wolf Quest (2002) — Muk, Luk, Wolverine #1
 Teacher's Pet (2002) — Spot Helperman, Scott Leadready II
 Stuart Little (2003) — Snowbell
 LeapFrog (2003-2004) — Mr. Frog, Mr. Websley (second voice, succeeding Tony Pope after his death)
 The Lion King 1½ (2004) — Iron Joe, Additional Voices
 Balto III: Wings of Change (2004) — Muk and Luk, Mr. Simpson
 Stuart Little 3: Call of the Wild (2005) — Snowbell
 Jack and the Beanstalk (2009) — Officer What
 Bubble Guppies (2013-2016) — Roboy
 Ben 10: Omniverse (2013) — Otto, Additional voices
 Sofia the First (2015) — Onyx
 The Lion Guard: Return of the Roar (2015) — Timon, Chungu
 The Lion Guard (2016–2019) — Timon, Chungu, Thurston

Video games

 Disney's Animated Storybook: Hercules (1997) — Additional voices
 The Lion King II: Simba's Pride Active Play (1998) — Timon
 Star Wars: Knights of the Old Republic (2003) — Additional voices
 Infamous Second Son (2014) — Activist
 State to State (2014) — Narrator
 Skylanders: Trap Team (2014) — Lobstar
 Battlefield: Hardline (2015) — Additional voices
 Skylanders: SuperChargers (2015) — Lob-Star
 Skylanders: Imaginators (2016) — Additional voices

Live-action
 The Naked Truth (1992) — Frank II and Mirabelle
 A Kiss Goodnight (1994) — Daryl O'Melveny
 Married... with Children  (1995) — TV Announcer (voice), Felix D. Katt, Mouse Lawyer (voice), Stage Manager, Phil

References

External links
 

1958 births
Living people
American male comedians
American male film actors
American male television actors
American male video game actors
American male voice actors
American theatre managers and producers
Comedians from California
Computer systems engineers
People from San Diego
Reiki practitioners
20th-century American male actors
21st-century American male actors